Admiral Giuseppe Cavo Dragone is an Italian naval officer, currently serving as Chief of the Defense Staff since 19 October 2021. Prior to his assumption, he served as the Chief of Staff of the Italian Navy from 21 June 2019 to 19 October 2021, and as commander of the Joint Operations Command, and the Joint Special Forces Operations Headquarters.

Early life and education
Dragone was born in Arquata Scrivia on 28 February 1957. He entered the Italian Naval Academy in Livorno in 1976 and graduated from his class in 1980. Dragone earned his Naval Aviator wings at the Naval Air Station Pensacola, Florida in 1989. Dragone returned to the US for the third time to enter the advanced training in Harrier Night Attack and Advanced Radar versions of the AV-8B Harrier II+ in 1993 at the Marine Corps Air Station Yuma. Dragone also holds a master's degree in naval and maritime sciences at the University of Pisa and a master's degree in political sciences from the University of Trieste Dragone is also a certified military paratrooper, scuba diver, free fall skydiver and karate black belter for Shotokan style Karate.

Career
Dragone is a naval aviator and served as a helicopter pilot for nearly 7 years, before being transferred in frigates and flew the UH-1 L Bell UH-1N Twin Huey, and the Sikorsky SH-3 Sea King helicopters. Dragone was among the few selected pilots transitioning to flying jets, where he flew the AV-8B Harrier II+ and garnered a total flight time of 2,500 hours. Dragone became a flight commander aboard the Maestrale-class frigates 1986–1987, and also served as a commanding officer in various ships in the Italian Navy. Dragone was placed in command of his first ship, the minehunter Milazzo from 1987 to 1988, before being placed as the commander of the Operations Unit (Reparto Operazioni) of the Italian Naval Aviation twice, from 1991 to 1993 and on 1997–1998. Dragone also became commander of the frigate Euro from 1996 to 1997. In 1999–2002, Dragone was named as the head of the Research & Development Office at the Naval Aviation Department, before serving as the commander of the aircraft carrier Giuseppe Garibaldi on 27 September 2002, and served as the carrier's commander until 2004. Following the wake of the September 11 attacks, Dragone was one of the commander of the GRUPNAVIT I, the Italian Naval Task Force deployed in Afghanistan, and carried out 288 various missions such as interception operations, close air and naval support, and aircraft interdiction missions, where the aerial operations accumulated a total of 860 flight hours. On 2005–2008, Dragone was appointed as the Navy General Staff Air Warfare and eventually became the commander of the Air Forces Command of the Italian Naval Aviation. 

In 2008, Dragone was appointed commander of the Italian Navy Special Forces Command (COMSUBIN) before being appointed as the superintendent of the Italian Naval Academy in 2011 and ended his term in 2014. In January 2012, in the aftermath of the Costa Concordia disaster, Dragone was named as head of the board of experts in advising search and rescue and recovery operations on the Costa Concordia, and assisted the judge in the trial of the case regarding the disaster. 

Dragone was appointed commander of the Joint Special Forces Operations Headquarters from 3 November 2014 to 26 June 2016. After his tour of duty, Dragone became the commander of the Joint Operations Command from 1 July 2016 to 20 June 2019. On 21 June 2019, Dragone replaced Admiral Valter Girardelli as Chief of the Staff of the Navy and two years later, on 19 October 2021, he was appointed by the Council of Ministers as the Chief of the Defense Staff.

Awards
  – Knight Grand Cross with Collar, Order of Merit of the Italian Republic
  Maurician medal
 “Air Duty" Gold Medal
 Command Duties Bronze Medal 
 Long Navigation Duty Medal
 Operation Enduring Freedom Medal
  United Nations Interim Force in Lebanon Medal
  – NATO medal for the former Yugoslavia
  – German Sports Badge
 Military Paratrooper Badge
 Military Scuba Diver Badge

References

1957 births
Living people
Naval aviators
Italian admirals
People from Arquata Scrivia